Doonaree may refer to:

 Doonaree, List of townlands of County Galway
 "Doonaree", song by E. Boland recorded by Vera Lynn in 1955, Carmel Quinn in 1955 and Robert Wilson in 1959
 Doonaree record label, with Shaskeen Shaskeen: Irish Pub Session, released 16 May 2006